Neil Robert Bennett (born 29 October 1980) is an English footballer who plays in the goalkeeping position. He currently plays for Wakefield.

Bennett began his career as a trainee with Sheffield Wednesday but made no League appearances before being released. He joined Ossett Town in the Northern Premier League First Division and made a number of appearances for them during the 2000–01 season. He then moved north of the border and joined Airdrieonians in the Scottish First Division and made 11 appearances for their first team in the 2001–02 season. He signed for Barrow in August 2002 and made his debut on the opening day of the 2002–03 season at home to Hucknall Town. He was replaced by the fit again Simon Bishop after a 3–0 home defeat by Ashton United in mid September and was released in early October. He then moved to Ireland, signing with Drogheda United in November 2002, and playing for them in a number of League of Ireland matches. Early in 2003, he signed a short-term contract with Bradford City He spent the last two months of the season at Rochdale in March 2003. He trialled with Coventry City in the summer of 2003, but did not join the club. He subsequently moved to play in the League of Ireland with Derry City where he made his debut for the club as a trialist in a high-profile friendly match against Barcelona before signing for the club and playing in the UEFA Cup.

In late August 2003 he joined Skelmersdale United.

In September 2003, he moved north of the border again joining Albion Rovers for a season before moving to Partick Thistle in the summer of 2004. During this period he went on loan to Forfar Athletic, but was recalled after one game on the substitute's bench due to an injury for one of Partick's goalkeepers. He was released by Thistle in August 2005.

He later made a return to Ossett Town in September 2005 before moving to Ossett Albion in 2006.

In March 2010 he joined Guiseley. He joined Wakefield in September 2012.

Honours
Airdrieonians
Scottish Challenge Cup: 2001–02

References

External links

1980 births
Living people
Airdrieonians F.C. (1878) players
Albion Rovers F.C. players
Association football goalkeepers
Barrow A.F.C. players
Bradford City A.F.C. players
Derry City F.C. players
Drogheda United F.C. players
English Football League players
English footballers
Expatriate association footballers in the Republic of Ireland
Footballers from Dewsbury
Forfar Athletic F.C. players
Guiseley A.F.C. players
League of Ireland players
Ossett Albion A.F.C. players
Ossett Town F.C. players
Partick Thistle F.C. players
Rochdale A.F.C. players
Scottish Football League players
Sheffield Wednesday F.C. players
Skelmersdale United F.C. players
Wakefield F.C. players